James Moffat (born 27 January 1960) is a Scottish former footballer and manager, currently without a club after being released by Montrose.

He played as a goalkeeper for several Scottish lower league clubs. After retiring from playing in 2001, Moffat was appointed as the assistant manager at Stirling Albion.

He then became the manager of East Fife in 2002. He achieved promotion from the Third Division in 2003, but the club were relegated in the following season. He was sacked in 2006 after a run of defeats.

He was appointed manager of Forfar in March 2007, but was sacked in April 2008 with the side just one point above last place in the Third Division.

Jim Moffat was appointed as Steven Tweed's assistant joining the club in June 2009 from Tayport Juniors where he held a similar position. 

On 3 June 2010, Montrose boss Steven Tweed decided to part company with his assistant, the former East Fife and Forfar manager Jim Moffat. The duo had teamed up at Links Park twelve months prior as Tweed looked to have an old head on board as he started his first full season as a player/manager.

Personal life
Moffat was a principal teacher of physical education at St Columba's Roman Catholic High School in Dunfermline, Fife.
He was principal teacher of physical education at Bell Baxter High School in Cupar in late 1990s to early 2010s.

Honours
East Fife
Scottish Third Division promotion : 2002-03
Fife Cup (2) : 2004-05, 2005–06

References

External links
 
 
 

1960 births
Montrose F.C. players
Hamilton Academical F.C. players
Dunfermline Athletic F.C. players
Forfar Athletic F.C. players
East Fife F.C. players
Brechin City F.C. players
Cowdenbeath F.C. players
East Stirlingshire F.C. players
Albion Rovers F.C. players
Association football goalkeepers
Forfar Athletic F.C. managers
East Fife F.C. managers
Living people
Footballers from Dunfermline
Scottish football managers
Scottish footballers
Scottish Football League players
Scottish schoolteachers
Scottish Football League managers